Shahida Badsha was a general of the Pakistan Army. She is the former principal of Army Medical College, Rawalpindi. She is daughter of Major General R.G.L.G. Badsha. She was awarded Hilal-e-Imtiaz military, which is the second highest distinction and award in Pakistan. She is passionate about improving medical education in Pakistan and so joined the doctoral program in Curriculum Studies in 2019.

Education
Badsha did her MBBS from Khyber Medical College in 1977. She received MCPS,  HPE on 18 December 2016

Distinction
She is the second female general of Pakistan, after Shahida Malik, and first female commandant of Army Medical College.

References

External links
 Index of Shahida Badsha's papers at PakMediNet

Pakistani generals
Female army generals
Pakistani military doctors
People of the insurgency in Khyber Pakhtunkhwa
Women in warfare post-1945
Living people
Pakistani female military officers
Year of birth missing (living people)
Khyber Medical College alumni